The name International Channel may represent:

International Channel Shanghai: Cable television channel based in Shanghai, China. Also known as ICS.
CFHD-DT, branded as International Channel/Canal International or ICI, an ethnic / multicultural television channel located in Montreal, Quebec, Canada 
AZN Television: Defunct American television channel previously called "International Channel"
XFM 96.3: Radio station in Singapore previously known as "International Channel 96.3FM"